George Miéville Simond (23 January 1867 – 8 April 1941) was an English tennis player who competed in the 1908 Summer Olympics. Simond was born in Marylebone.  In 1908 he won the silver medal in the men's indoor doubles competition together with his partner George Caridia.

References

External links

1867 births
1941 deaths
English male tennis players
Olympic silver medallists for Great Britain
Olympic tennis players of Great Britain
People from Marylebone
Tennis players at the 1908 Summer Olympics
Olympic medalists in tennis
Medalists at the 1908 Summer Olympics
British male tennis players
Tennis people from Greater London